Jacques Dubon, (Moissac, 28 May 1931 -  Villeneuve-sur-Lot, 22 February 2008) was a French rugby league player of the 1950s and 1960s.

For all of his career, he played for Villeneuve-sur-Lot with which he won the French Championship in 1959 and 1964, as well as the Lord Derby Cup in 1958 and 1964. He ended his career for La Réole and then for Clairac.

With his club performances,he was capped 12 times for France between 1960 and 1962 taking part at the 1960 Rugby League World Cup.

Biographie 
Outside the field, he worked as an accountant.

Honours 

 Team honours :
 French Champion : 1959 and 1964 (Villeneuve-sur-Lot).
 Winner of the Lord Derby Cup : 1958 and 1964 (Villeneuve-sur-Lot).
 Runner-up at the French Championship : 1962 and 1965 (Villeneuve-sur-Lot).

Notes and references

Notes

References

Bibliography

External links 

 Jacques Dubon at rugbyleagueproject.org

1931 births
2008 deaths
France national rugby league team players
Villeneuve Leopards players
Sportspeople from Tarn-et-Garonne
Rugby league wingers
French rugby league players